Mesoscincus is a genus of lizards, comprising three species of skinks native to Mexico and Central America. The species were formerly included in the genus Eumeces.

Species
Mesoscincus altamirani  – Tepalcatepec skink – Mexico
Mesoscincus managuae  – Managua skink – Costa Rica, Nicaragua, Honduras, Guatemala and El SalvadorMesoscincus schwartzei  – Mayan black-headed skink, Schwartze's skink – Mexico, Guatemala, and Belize

Nota bene: A binomial authority in parentheses indicates that the species was originally described in a genus other than Mesoscincus.

References

Further reading
Griffith, Hugh; Ngo, André; Murphy, Robert W. (2000). "A Cladistic Evaluation of the Cosmopolitan Genus Eumeces Wiegmann (Reptilia, Squamata, Scincidae)". Russian Journal of Herpetology 7' (1): 1–16. (Mesoscincus'', new genus).

Mesoscincus
Vertebrates of Mexico
Reptiles of Central America
Lizard genera